The National Centre for Popular Music was a museum in Sheffield, England, for pop and rock music and contemporary culture generally, a £15 million project largely funded with contributions from the National Lottery, which opened on 1 March 1999, and closed in June 2000.  However, the plan for the centre was devised in the mid-1980s and Sheffield City Council were aiming to raise the money for it in April 1993 so the concept long predated the Tony Blair / Cool Britannia era of which it was seen as a notable failure.

Building
The building, designed by Branson Coates following an architectural design competition managed by RIBA Competitions, consists of four giant stainless steel drums, surrounding an atrium area, the upper floor of which has a glazed roof.

Each of the drums has a rotating turret with a nozzle which is meant to turn with the wind and vent air.  On the other side, an opening facing the wind takes inlet air down through wall cavities, being heated or cooled as required.  Air is drawn out of the nozzle by buoyancy and wind pressure.

The ground floor contained office space, a shop, a bar, a café and a further exhibition space. Access to this floor was free, with only the top floor forming the museum.

Closure
The centre was one of the UK's Millennium Commission projects, developed to celebrate the turn of the millennium. Other Commission funded projects included the Millennium Dome and the London Eye.

However the Centre failed to attract enough visitors and cash flow to ensure its viability for its 79 workers – BBC News described the centre as having been "shunned" by visitors, and, despite a £2 million relaunch, the Centre closed in 2000.

Ticket prices were about £21 for a family of four. It was hoped to attract 400,000 visitors a year. After seven months, there had been 104,000 visitors, and on 18 October 1999 the building's owners, Music Heritage Ltd, called in PricewaterhouseCoopers to administer its day-to-day running. The company was to be liquidated in that November if administration was not successful. It was saved in the interim although £1.1 million was owed to 200 creditors. The estimate of visitors per year was reduced to 150,000. Martin King, the chief executive who took over from Stuart Rogers, resigned in January 2000.

Just prior to closure, BBC Radio 2 held an event hosted by Billy Bragg and attended by around 75 prizewinners, to see Madness perform live with support from Paul Carrack.

Subsequent use
The building became a live music venue for a period from July 2001, then in 2003 Sheffield Hallam University bought it from Yorkshire Forward for £1.85 million. It is now the university's Students' Union.

See also
 List of music museums
National Science and Media Museum
 Millennium Dome
 British Music Experience – opened ten years later in March 2009 in London

References

External links
Sheffield Hallam University Students Union
 

Culture in Sheffield
Music in Sheffield
History of Sheffield
Buildings and structures in Sheffield
Music museums in England
Buildings and structures completed in 1999
1999 establishments in England
Organizations disestablished in 2000
2000 disestablishments in England
Defunct museums in England
British popular culture